= Festival Unruhr =

Festival Unruhr is a theatre festival in Germany.
